R v Secretary of State for the Home Department, ex parte Doody [1993] UKHL 8, [1994] 1 AC 531 was an important UK constitutional law case concerning applications for judicial review.

Facts
Four prisoners, Stephen Doody, John David Pierson, Elfed Wayne Smart and Kenneth Pegg, serving mandatory life sentences, requested judicial review after the Home Secretary refused to release them after serving their minimum terms, but gave no reason for the decision. Under common law, there is no duty to give reasons for decisions; however, this case is one of the exceptions.

Judgment
Lord Mustill judged that the Home Secretary must give reasons for their decision. He argued that decisions made using a statutory power must be reached fairly, because all statutory powers are granted with the implicit assumption that they will be wielded fairly. As a result, he concluded it will often be necessary to allow a person to make representations, and therefore to allow them to know what they are responding to, they must be permitted to hear the reason they are having to make the representations at all.

See also
Judicial review

References

External links
 Judgment on BAILII

United Kingdom administrative case law
House of Lords cases
1993 in case law
1993 in British law
Home Office litigation
United Kingdom constitutional case law